Micropholcus is a genus of cellar spiders that was first described by Christa Laetitia Deeleman-Reinhold & J. D. Prinsen in 1987.

Species
It accepted a number of transfers from genus Leptopholcus in 2014, increasing its number of species to 15.  it contains 17 species, with a pantropical distribution:
Micropholcus agadir (Huber, 2011) – Morocco
Micropholcus baoruco (Huber, 2006) – Hispaniola
Micropholcus brazlandia (Huber, Pérez & Baptista, 2005) – Brazil
Micropholcus crato Huber, Carvalho & Benjamin, 2014 – Brazil
Micropholcus dalei (Petrunkevitch, 1929) – Puerto Rico, Virgin Is.
Micropholcus delicatulus (Franganillo, 1930) – Cuba
Micropholcus evaluna (Huber, Pérez & Baptista, 2005) – Venezuela
Micropholcus fauroti (Simon, 1887) (type) – Temperate Asia. Introduced to both Americas, Belgium, Germany, Africa, Sri Lanka, Southeast Asia, Australia, Pacific Is.
Micropholcus hispaniola (Huber, 2000) – Hispaniola
Micropholcus jacominae Deeleman-Reinhold & van Harten, 2001 – Yemen
Micropholcus jamaica (Huber, 2000) – Jamaica
Micropholcus pataxo (Huber, Pérez & Baptista, 2005) – Brazil
Micropholcus piaui Huber, Carvalho & Benjamin, 2014 – Brazil
Micropholcus piracuruca Huber, Carvalho & Benjamin, 2014 – Brazil
Micropholcus tegulifer (Barrientos, 2019) – Morocco
Micropholcus toma (Huber, 2006) – Hispaniola
Micropholcus ubajara Huber, Carvalho & Benjamin, 2014 – Brazil

See also
 List of Pholcidae species

References

Araneomorphae genera
Pantropical spiders
Pholcidae